City View , a former incorporated city, is now a census-designated place (CDP) in Greenville County, South Carolina, United States. The population was 1,345 at the 2010 census, up from 1,254 in 2000. It is part of the Greenville–Mauldin–Easley Metropolitan Statistical Area.

History
Monaghan Mill and Parker High School Auditorium are listed on the National Register of Historic Places.

Geography
City View is located in central Greenville County at  (34.862100, -82.426688), and is bordered to the east by the city of Greenville. To the north is unincorporated San Souci, and to the west is Parker, also unincorporated.

Demographics

As of the census of 2000, there were 1,254 people, 469 households, and 296 families residing in the CDP. The population density was 2,355.0 people per square mile (913.5/km2). There were 575 housing units at an average density of 1,079.8/sq mi (418.9/km2). The racial makeup of the CDP was 63.08% White, 31.50% African American, 0.88% Native American, 0.24% Asian, 2.63% from other races, and 1.67% from two or more races. Hispanic or Latino of any race were 7.50% of the population.

There were 469 households, out of which 34.1% had children under the age of 18 living with them, 35.0% were married couples living together, 22.0% had a female householder with no husband present, and 36.7% were non-families. 29.4% of all households were made up of individuals, and 9.2% had someone living alone who was 65 years of age or older. The average household size was 2.67 and the average family size was 3.32.

In the CDP, the population was spread out, with 29.5% under the age of 18, 9.6% from 18 to 24, 30.7% from 25 to 44, 20.9% from 45 to 64, and 9.3% who were 65 years of age or older. The median age was 32 years. For every 100 females, there were 91.7 males. For every 100 females age 18 and over, there were 84.9 males.

The median income for a household in the CDP was $21,920, and the median income for a family was $25,208. Males had a median income of $25,847 versus $18,824 for females. The per capita income for the CDP was $9,532. About 27.6% of families and 29.0% of the population were below the poverty line, including 37.3% of those under age 18 and 9.7% of those age 65 or over.

References

Census-designated places in Greenville County, South Carolina
Census-designated places in South Carolina
Upstate South Carolina